Ocean Man 69 is an Indian reserve of the Ocean Man First Nation in Saskatchewan. It is 20 kilometres northeast of Stoughton. In the 2016 Canadian Census, it recorded a population of 185 living in 56 of its 61 total private dwellings. In the same year, its Community Well-Being index was calculated at 48 of 100, compared to 58.4 for the average First Nations community and 77.5 for the average non-Indigenous community.

References

Indian reserves in Saskatchewan
Division No. 1, Saskatchewan
Ocean Man First Nation